Onika may refer to:

 Onika Maraj (born 1982), rapper and singer known professionally as Nicki Minaj
 Onika Wallerson (born 1985), American cricketer
 Joseph Onika (born 1967), Solomon Island politician
 Abbas Ali Atwi (born 1984), Lebanese footballer also known as Onika

See also